Richmond Airport  is a privately owned, public use airport in Washington County, Rhode Island, United States. It is located three nautical miles (6 km) west of the central business district of the village of West Kingston, Rhode Island, in the town of Richmond, Rhode Island.

Facilities and aircraft 
Richmond Airport covers an area of 67 acres (27 ha) at an elevation of 130 feet (40 m) above mean sea level. It has one runway designated 11/29 with an asphalt surface measuring 2,129 by 30 feet (649 x 9 m).

For the 12-month period ending August 30, 2012, the airport had 7,100 general aviation aircraft operations, an average of 19 per day. At that time there were 24 aircraft based at this airport: 71% single-engine and 29% ultralight.

References

External links 
 Aerial image as of April 2001 from USGS The National Map
 
 

Airports in Rhode Island
Transportation buildings and structures in Washington County, Rhode Island